Bukit Saban may refer to:
Bukit Saban
Bukit Saban (state constituency), represented in the Sarawak State Legislative Assembly